Manuel Seff (1895–1969) was an American playwright and screenwriter.

Selected filmography
 Terror Aboard (1933)
 The Girl in 419 (1933)
 Footlight Parade (1933)
 Easy to Love (1934)
 Gold Diggers of 1935 (1935)
 Traveling Saleslady (1935)
 A Night at the Ritz (1935)
 Trouble for Two (1936)
 Kansas City Kitty (1944)
 Sailor's Holiday (1944)
 Louisiana Hayride (1944)
 Hitchhike to Happiness (1945)
 The Falcon's Alibi (1946)
 Unmasked (1950)

References

Bibliography
 Balio, Tino. Grand Design: Hollywood as a Modern Business Enterprise, 1930-1939. University of California Press, 1995.

External links

1895 births
1969 deaths
20th-century American dramatists and playwrights
20th-century American screenwriters